Callicore hydaspes, the Hydaspes eighty-eight or little callicore, is a species of butterfly of the family Nymphalidae.

Description
The uppersides of the forewings are black with a broad red median band and a blue basal area. Also the uppersides of the hindwings are black, while the electric-blue area is larger and extended up to the edges. The undersides of the forewings are similar to uppersides but show also a yellow band. The basic colour of the undersides of the hindwings is black, with four pale blue or yellow spots in the middle of a black oval surrounded by concentric yellow bands.

Distribution
This species is found in Brazil (Rio de Janeiro, Piauí, Rio Grande do Sul, São Paulo), Paraguay, Peru and Argentina. It is mainly present in humid forests and in edges.

References

External links
 Butterflies of Argentina
 Fauna Paraguay
 Neotropical butterflies
 Butterflies of America

Biblidinae
Lepidoptera of Brazil
Nymphalidae of South America
Butterflies described in 1782